Peșteana may refer to several places in Romania:

 Peșteana, a village in Densuș Commune, Hunedoara County
 Peșteana, a village in Florești Commune, Mehedinți County
 Peșteana de Jos, a village in Fărcășești Commune, Gorj County
 Peșteana-Jiu, a village in Bâlteni Commune, Gorj County
 Peșteana-Vulcan, a village in Ciuperceni Commune, Gorj County 
 Peșteana (Tismana), a tributary of the Tismana in Gorj County
 Peșteana (Motru), a tributary of the Motru in Mehedinți County
 Peșteana (Olteț), a tributary of the Olteț in Vâlcea County